Mali made its Paralympic Games début at the 2000 Summer Paralympics in Sydney, sending a single representative (Facourou Sissoko) to compete in powerlifting. In the up to 75 kg category, he lifted 130 kg - finishing last of the seventeen competitors who successfully lifted a weight. He therefore did not win a medal.

Mali did not compete at the Paralympic Games in 2004 as the country sends 9 officials. Although he was due to compete in 2008, as Mali's sole competitor, Sissoko was banned due to testing positive for boldenone metabolite (a steroid) on the day of the opening ceremony.

Mahamane Sacko represented Mali on the track at the 2012 Summer Paralympics, but did not proceed past the heats.

Results for Mali at the Paralympics

See also
 Mali at the Olympics

References